His Majesty Minor is a French-Spanish feature film by French director Jean-Jacques Annaud. It is his third film shot entirely in his native language of French since his 1976 Oscar-winning debut Black and White in Color and his 1978 film Coup de tête featuring Patrick Dewaere. It is a mythical comedy taking place on an island in the Aegean Sea before the founding of Ancient Greece.

It was filmed in 2006 in Benitatxell and Benigembla, basically in the district of the Marina Alta, which is located in the Valencian Community.

The film was produced by French companies StudioCanal and Pathé in partnership with Malvarrosa Media and Mediapro in Spain.

Despite its originality, the movie was poorly received, both by critics and the audience.

Plot
Minor (Garcia) was abandoned by his parents as a child and was raised by a pack of pigs; he speaks in porcine grunts and lives and loves much like his fellow hogs. Minor is just human enough to have his head turned by Clytia (Bernier), a beautiful girl living in the nearby village. However, if Minor's lack of social skills weren't enough to keep Clytia away, she's already been pledged to wed handsome and charming Karkos (Peris-Mencheta). When Minor runs afoul of the tribal leadership, he's removed from his home with the pigs and forced to live in an enchanted forest, where he attracts the not entirely welcome attentions of Pan (Cassel), a randy half-man and half-goat willing to couple with anything that breathes. When Minor emerges from the forest able to speak with newfound eloquence, the tribal leaders name him their new potentate, and Clytia suddenly finds him a great deal more appealing, which doesn't sit well with Karkos.

Cast
 José García as Minor
 Vincent Cassel as Satyre
 Sergio Peris-Mencheta as Karkos
 Mélanie Bernier as Clytia
 Claude Brasseur as Firos
 Rufus as Rectus
 Jean-Luc Bideau as Archeo

See also
 Pan in popular culture

References

External links
 Sa majesté Minor at Internet Movie Database.

2007 films
French comedy films
2000s French-language films
Films directed by Jean-Jacques Annaud
2007 comedy films
Films with screenplays by Gérard Brach
Films scored by Javier Navarrete
Pathé films
StudioCanal films
2000s French films
2000s Spanish films
Spanish comedy films
Films set in the Mediterranean Sea